The Life Zone is an anti-abortion horror film written and produced by Kenneth del Vecchio, directed and edited by Rod Weber and starring Robert Loggia, Blanche Baker, Lindsay Haun, Angela Little, and Nina Transfield. It was released as a straight-to-DVD in 2011.

It was panned by critics, with the main criticism on its anti-abortion message, but also focus on bad acting, screenplay, and lack of scares.

Plot
Three women who had gone to get abortions wake up to find that they have been kidnapped and are being held captive by a doctor who intends for them to deliver their unwanted babies. Instead of the usual horror fare, the nightgown-garbed women drink warm milk while reading and watching propaganda on why abortion is wrong.

After a while, two of the women decide against having abortions and agree to have their babies, while the third still resists and even tries to force a miscarriage.

Suddenly it transpires that the two women who gave birth were never real; it turns out that the die-harder died on the abortion table and the doctor had committed suicide, and both of them are in Hell.

Reaction
Fewer than 50 people—including the cast and producers—attended the premiere. When interviewed afterwards, several cast members could not decipher the ending of the film.

Reviews of the film were generally negative:
 "How Insane is the Pro-Life Horror Flick The Life Zone? Let Us Count the Ways" wrote Movieline.com 
 "The Life Zone Trailer Introduces Us to Pro-Life, Forced-Breeding Horror" - Movies.com 
 "Low-Budget Horror 'Life Zone' Pushes Pro-Life Message... Sorta" - NextMovie.com 
 "This Exists: NJ State Senate Candidate Ken Del Vecchio Offers Anti-Abortion Version Of Saw" - Mediaite.com  
 "The First Trailer for The Life Zone Tackles Abortion and Forced Birthing" - This is one of the first independent films that this film lover has seen on YouTube, which has several more dislikes than likes. The comments for this film are pretty scathing, too. - 28 days later analysis 
 "Find yourself on the receiving end of an unwanted pregnancy? Thinking about having an abortion? How dare you assume that you can do with your body what you wish! Finally there's a madman ready to stifle that ludicrous conclusion! A right-to-lifer with methods so misguided that the recently departed Jack Kevorkian would call him extreme!" - Dread Central 
 "If Del Vecchio and director Rob Webber would have turned out a decently directed and written movie, it wouldn’t have mattered if they were arguing the finer points of scrotum torture, I would have given a decent review to this film despite my close relationship with my ballsack. But instead of trying to make an entertaining movie, I think the makers of this film were more interested in spewing out one uninterrupted Pro-Life argument after another and squelch any Pro-Choice responses. In that they were successful in making a film where everyone talks as if they were reciting bullet points, too bad they forgot to make it entertaining, scary, or even morally sensible." - Ain't It Cool News

References
  Text was copied from The Life Zone at Rational Wiki, which is released under a Creative Commons Attribution-Share Alike 3.0 (Unported) (CC-BY-SA 3.0) license.

External links

2011 films
2011 horror films
American horror films
2010s English-language films
Anti-abortion movement
2010s American films